Rajgir railway station is a railway station serving the city of Rajgir in the Indian state of Bihar. Rajgir is in the Danapur railway division of the East Central Railway zone. It is located near Jawahar Navodaya Vidyalaya Rajgir Nalanda.

History
Bakhtiarpur–Bihar Light Railway was a -wide narrow-gauge railway laid by Martin's Light Railways from Bakhtiarpur to Bihar Sharif in 1903 and extended to Rajgir in 1911.

The broad-gauge line was extended from Rajgir to Tilaiya and opened in 2010. This line will transport coal from the Hazaribagh–Koderma coal belt for Barh Thermal Power Station via Harnaut railway station. The line was sanctioned in 2001–02 and is to be extended up to Koderma.

Facilities 

The major facilities available are waiting rooms, retiring room, computerised reservation facility, reservation counter, and vehicle parking. The vehicles are allowed to enter the station premises. There are refreshment rooms, vegetarian and non-vegetarian, tea stall, book stall, post and telegraphic office and Government Railway Police (G.R.P.) office. Automatic ticket vending machines have been installed to reduce the queue for train tickets on the station.

Platform

There are three platforms in the Rajgir railway station. The platforms are interconnected with foot overbridges (FOB). It has two foot overbridges, the third overbridge is under construction.

Trains
Rajgir railway station is a major station of the East Central Railways. Several local passenger trains also run from Rajgir to neighbouring destinations at frequent intervals.
The following table lists all the trains passing from Rajgir station:

Nearest airport 
Airports near by Rajgir are:
 Patna International Airport (99.5 km)
 Gaya International Airport (75.2 km)
 Rajgir international Airport Rajgir Nalanda 2 km

In February 2012, the Indian Railways had planned to set up a Railway Station Development Corporation (RSDC) that will work on improving the major railway stations including Rajgir railway station by building and developing restaurants, shopping areas and food plazas for commercial business and improving passenger amenities.

References 

Railway stations in Nalanda district
Danapur railway division
Transport in Rajgir